Ignatius Mouradgea d'Ohsson (31 July 1740 – 27 August 1807) was an Armenian orientalist, historian and diplomat in Swedish service. In 1768 he was supreme interpreter, in its subsequent elevation to the Swedish nobility, he participated in the French-sounding names d'Ohsson. Abraham Constantin Mouradgea d’Ohsson, author of a famous History of the Mongols, was his son. He lived many years in France.

Biography
He was born at Pera, the European part of Istanbul, in 1740 as Ignatius Muradjan Tosunian the son of a Catholic family. His father was an interpreter at the Swedish Embassy and followed his father by entering into the service of the Swedish embassy at the Ottoman Porte, and by his talents attained the highest diplomatic honours. He was made charge of affairs, knight of the order of Vasa and in 1782 minister plenipotentiary and envoy extraordinary. His knowledge of the Arabic language and Turkish languages gave him the means of acquiring information respecting the Ottoman Empire from the best sources. He resolved upon writing a history of Ottoman Sultan Selim II, but this was suspended by his plan of giving a full picture of the Ottoman Empire. To this work he devoted himself with the greatest zeal and perseverance, and with great difficulty succeeded in collecting the first authentic information from a prejudiced, servile, and jealous people, respecting and national customs and habitats, the interior of the seraglio, the mosques and the private life of a Turk.

With the materials which he had obtained, he proceeded to Paris in 1784, where he prepared his work for the press, and published it in 1788 and 1789, in two volumes, under the title of Tableau Général de l’Empire Othoman. This work completely answered the expectations which had been formed respecting it. The beauty of the typography and engravings occasioned an expense which exceeded the proceeds of the sale; but d'Ohsson who possessed a large fortune, was willing to make sacrifices for the embellishment and perfection of his work. The revolution interrupted his literary activity, and he returned to Constantinople. Sultan Selim III, who honoured knowledge, allowed the two volumes which were published to be presented to him, and, far from being displeased at the disclosure of some secrets, gave orders to facilitate the learned writer's researches by affording him the necessary information.

After a long sojourn in Constantinople, d'Ohsson returned to Paris, where he found hardly any traces of his large property. Even the buildings where he had deposited the copies of his work, and the plates, drawings &c., had been destroyed and plundered. Without allowing himself to be depressed by these misfortunes, he devised a still greater plan, which had in view a historical picture of the whole East, and became entirely absorbed in his desire to execute it. In 1804 he had completely two volumes of his Tableau Historique de l’Orient, when the war with Sweden made him apprehensive of another interruption. He asked and received permission from his government to retire to the country. Here he continued to occupy himself on his undertaking during three years, and gave the fruit of fifty-four years' labour to the world, in a work which contains, in three separate divisions, a complete view of the Ottoman Empire. These three divisions have the separate titles, Tableau Historique de l’Orient, a history of all nations under the Ottoman government: Tableau Général de l’Empire Othoman, a view of the laws, religion and customs, &c.; lastly, L'Histoire de la Maison Ottomane, from Osman I till 1758. The whole was nearly completed when it was interrupted by d'Ohsson's death on 27 August 1807.

Works
 Tableau Historique de l’Orient. 2 volumes.
 Tableau Général de l’Empire Othoman. 7 volumes. Firmin Didot, Paris 1788-1824.
 German: Allgemeine Schilderung des Othomanischen Reichs. Abridged and translated by Christian Daniel Beck. 2 vols. Weidmann, Leipzig 1788/1793.
 L'Histoire de la Maison Ottomane. From Osman I till 1758.

Literature
 Carter Vaughn Findley. Enlightening Europe on Islam and the Ottomans:  Mouradgea d’Ohsson and His Masterpiece, Brill, Leiden, 2019, xv + 398 pages
 Elisabeth A. Fraser: „Dressing Turks in the French Manner“. Mouradgea d’Ohsson’s Panorama of the Ottoman Empire. In: Ars Orientalis. Bd. 39 (2009), S. 198–230.
 Elisabeth A. Fraser, Mediterranean Encounters: Artists Between Europe and the Ottoman Empire, 1774-1839, Penn State University Press, 2017.

References
 The British Cyclopaedia of the Arts, Sciences, History, Geography, Literature, Natural History, and Biography ...

External links 
 UGAB Magazine numéro 5 – 2e trimestre 2000
 The Armenian Community In Sweden
 Findley: Mouradgea d’Ohsson and His Tableau général de l’empire othoman (engl.) (PDF-Datei; 146 kB)
 Literatur von und über Vater und Sohn D' Ohsson im Katalog der SUB Göttingen
 Ignatius Mouradgea d’Ohsson 

1740 births
1807 deaths
Diplomats of the Ottoman Empire
Swedish orientalists
Swedish diplomats
Armenians from the Ottoman Empire
Swedish people of Armenian descent
Writers from Istanbul
Emigrants from the Ottoman Empire to Sweden
Diplomats from Istanbul